Wendell Davis (born October 24, 1975) is a former American football tight end and fullback. He played college football at Temple. Professionally, he played for the San Diego Chargers of the National Football League (NFL) and Edmonton Eskimos of the Canadian Football League. After his playing career, Davis was an assistant coach for various college and NFL Europe teams for eight years.

Early life and college career
Born in Escatawpa, Mississippi, Davis attended Moss Point High School in Moss Point, Mississippi. He began his college football career at Mississippi Gulf Coast Community College in 1994 and 1995, earning all-state honors both seasons. He transferred to Temple University and played for the Temple Owls in 1996 and 1997. With 11 starts, Davis had 19 receptions for 231 yards and two touchdowns for Temple.

Professional football career
Following the 1998 NFL Draft, Davis signed with the San Diego Chargers as an undrafted free agent on April 20, 1998. In what would be his only season playing in the NFL, Davis played in 11 games with seven starts for the Chargers, making four receptions for 23 yards.

Davis moved to fullback in 1999. The Chargers waived Davis on September 9, 1999, days before the regular season began, to free a roster spot for wide receiver Chris Penn.

In the spring of 2000, Davis signed with the Rhein Fire of NFL Europe. However, due to turf toe, he did not play in any games and was released three games into the season. Davis later signed with the San Diego Chargers on May 9, 2000. The Chargers released Davis on August 26, 2000, prior to the regular season.

On August 15, 2001, Davis signed again with the Chargers. He was released 12 days later.

In 2002, Davis played in 11 games for the Edmonton Eskimos at fullback. He had nine receptions for 64 yards, 23 carries for 97 yards and two touchdowns, three kick returns for 32 yards, and six tackles.

Coaching career
Davis began his coaching career as running backs coach at Christopher Newport, an NCAA Division III school, working in that position in 2004 and 2005. In the 2005 and 2006 seasons, Davis was also running backs coach for the Amsterdam Admirals of NFL Europe. In 2007, Davis was tight ends coach for the Cologne Centurions in what was NFL Europe's final year of operation.

Returning to the college level, Davis was wide receivers coach at Gannon in 2008. He returned to Christopher Newport as running backs coach for the 2010 and 2011 seasons.

References 

1975 births
Living people
People from Moss Point, Mississippi
Players of American football from Mississippi
African-American players of Canadian football
American football tight ends
Canadian football fullbacks
Temple Owls football players
San Diego Chargers players
Christopher Newport Captains football coaches
Gannon Golden Knights football coaches
Amsterdam Admirals coaches
Cologne Centurions (NFL Europe) coaches
Mississippi Gulf Coast Bulldogs football players
Edmonton Elks players
21st-century African-American sportspeople
20th-century African-American sportspeople